Je Pan Kahish E Sachuj Kahish is a 2016 Gujarati thriller film starring Gaurav Paswala and Sneha Devganiya. The film is directed by Naitik Raval.

Cast 
 Gaurav Paswala as Dhaval
 Sneha Devganiya as Leeza
 Shriya Tiwari as Maaya

Soundtrack 
The songs of the film are composed by Mehul Surti. Lyrics are penned by Raeesh Maniar.

Release 
The film was released on 14 October 2016.

Awards

2016 Gujarati Iconic Film Awards 
The film won five awards.

 Best Background Music – Mehul Surti
 Best Screenplay- Naitik Raval, Akshay Paniker
 Best Actress – Sneha Devganiya
 Best Editor – Naitik Raval
 Best Remarkable Film of the Year – Jury Award – Rohan Shah

References

External links 
 

2016 films
2016 thriller films